This is a list of notable photochemists. Photochemistry, a sub-discipline of chemistry, is the study of chemical reactions that proceed with the absorption of light by atoms or molecules.

Photochemists

 Nicola Armaroli
 Vincenzo Balzani
 E. J. Bowen
 John William Draper
 Arthur Eichengrün
 Theodor Grotthuss
 Selig Hecht
 Michael Kasha
 Walter Metcalf
 David Phillips
 James Pitts 
 Fritz Weigert
 Zhenghua ZHU (List of publications, incomplete)

See also
 Photochemistry
 Lists of people by occupation

Lists of natural scientists